Triumph Records was an American record label, founded in 1958 when Herb Abramson left Atlantic Records, but the label only existed for a short time. By 1960, Abramson formed Triumph-Blaze Productions to produce recordings for distribution by other labels.

See also
 List of record labels
 Triumph Records (UK)

References

Record labels established in 1958
Defunct record labels of the United States
1958 establishments in the United States